The 1974 New York Yankees season was the 72nd season for the team. The team finished second in the American League East with a record of 89–73, two games behind the Baltimore Orioles in Bill Virdon's first season as manager. The Yankees played at Shea Stadium due to the ongoing renovation of Yankee Stadium.

Offseason 
The off-season became controversial when George Steinbrenner and Gabe Paul sought to hire former Oakland Athletics manager Dick Williams, who had resigned immediately after leading the team to its second straight World Series title. However, because Williams was still under contract to Oakland, A's owner Charlie Finley sought to block the move, the subsequent legal wrangling prevented the Yankees from hiring him. On the first anniversary of the team's ownership change, the Yankees hired former Pittsburgh Pirates manager Bill Virdon to lead the team on the field.

Notable transactions 
 December 6, 1973: Jim Mason was purchased by the Yankees from the Texas Rangers.
 December 7, 1973: Lindy McDaniel was traded by the Yankees to the Kansas City Royals for Lou Piniella and Ken Wright.
 December 10, 1973: Hal Lanier was released by the Yankees.
 December 11, 1973: Ron Swoboda was released by the Yankees.
 January 9, 1974: Ken Phelps was drafted by the Yankees in the 1st round (11th pick) of the 1974 Major League Baseball Draft, but did not sign.
 March 19, 1974: Jerry Moses was traded by the Yankees to the Detroit Tigers as part of a 3-team trade. The Cleveland Indians sent Walt Williams and Rick Sawyer to the Yankees, and the Tigers sent Ed Farmer to the Yankees. The Tigers sent Jim Perry to the Indians.

Regular season 
 August 25, 1974: Nolan Ryan of the California Angels struck out Sandy Alomar Sr. of the Yankees for the 1500th strikeout of his career. Ryan and Alomar had been teammates at the beginning of the season, but Alomar had been sold to the Yankees on July 8.
 September 7, 1974: The Yankees' Graig Nettles hit a home run against the Detroit Tigers. The next time up, he hit a broken-bat single. Tigers catcher Bill Freehan scrambled for the six superballs that came bouncing out. Nettles was called out on the single, but his solo homer was allowed and that made all the difference as the Yankees won 1–0.

Hall of Fame 

Mickey Mantle and former teammate Whitey Ford were elected to the Baseball Hall of Fame together in 1974, Mantle in his first year of eligibility, Ford in his second. Ford's number 16 was retired as well. Although Ford wore number 19 in his rookie season, following his return from the army in 1953, he wore number 16 for the remainder of his career.

Season standings

Record vs. opponents

Notable transactions 
 April 26, 1974: Fritz Peterson, Steve Kline, Fred Beene, and Tom Buskey were traded by the Yankees to the Cleveland Indians for Chris Chambliss, Dick Tidrow and Cecil Upshaw.
 May 4, 1974: Mike Pazik and cash were traded by the Yankees to the Minnesota Twins for Dick Woodson.
 May 31, 1974: Horace Clarke and Lowell Palmer were purchased from the Yankees by the San Diego Padres.
 June 5, 1974: Dennis Sherrill was drafted by the Yankees in the 1st round (12th pick) of the 1974 Major League Baseball Draft.
 June 15, 1974: Rudy May was purchased by the Yankees from the California Angels.
 July 8, 1974: Sandy Alomar Sr. was purchased by the Yankees from the California Angels.
 September 29, 1974: Jesús Figueroa was signed as an amateur free agent by the Yankees.

Roster

Player stats

Batting

Starters by position 
Note: Pos = Position; G = Games played; AB = At bats; H = Hits; Avg. = Batting average; HR = Home runs; RBI = Runs batted in

Other batters 
Note: G = Games played; AB = At bats; H = Hits; Avg. = Batting average; HR = Home runs; RBI = Runs batted in

Pitching

Starting pitchers 
Note: G = Games pitched; IP = Innings pitched; W = Wins; L = Losses; ERA = Earned run average; SO = Strikeouts

Other pitchers 
Note: G = Games pitched; IP = Innings pitched; W = Wins; L = Losses; ERA = Earned run average; SO = Strikeouts

Relief pitchers 
Note: G = Games pitched; W = Wins; L = Losses; SV = Saves; ERA = Earned run average; SO = Strikeouts

Awards and honors 
 Bill Virdon, The Sporting News Manager of the Year Award

Farm system 

LEAGUE CHAMPIONS: Oneonta

Notes

References 
1974 New York Yankees at Baseball Reference
1974 New York Yankees team page at www.baseball-almanac.com

New York Yankees seasons
New York Yankees
New York Yankees
1970s in Queens